Sir Edward Crisp Bullard FRS (21 September 1907 – 3 April 1980) was a British geophysicist who is considered, along with Maurice Ewing, to have founded the discipline of marine geophysics. He developed the theory of the geodynamo, pioneered the use of seismology to study the sea floor, measured geothermal heat flow through the ocean crust, and found new evidence for the theory of continental drift.

Early life
Bullard was born into a wealthy brewing family in Norwich, England. He was educated at Norwich School and later studied Natural Sciences at Clare College, Cambridge. He studied under Ernest Rutherford at the Cavendish Laboratory of University of Cambridge and in the 1930s he received his PhD degree as a nuclear physicist.

As it was the Great Depression and he was married, he had to find a career to survive on. In the 1930s, nuclear physics did not seem to be it so he switched to geophysics.

In 1931, Bullard became a demonstrator in the department of geodesy and geophysics at Cambridge, which at the time of its formation in 1921 consisted of only one person, Sir Gerald Lenox-Conyngham. By himself Lenox-Conyngham was unable to do much. By 1931 he had persuaded the university that he needed help, and had been given funds for a junior post. On the advice of Rutherford he appointed Bullard to this position. At the same time Harold Jeffreys was appointed to a readership in geophysics. In the next eight years, this small group of people had a quite remarkable impact on geophysics.
[encyclopedia.com on Bullard]

During World War II, he was an experimental officer at HMS Vernon and worked on the development of degaussing techniques to protect shipping from magnetic mines.

Career
Bullard held a chair at the University of Toronto from 1948 to 1950 and was head of the National Physical Laboratory between 1950 and 1955. He was knighted in the 1953 Coronation Honours List. He returned to Cambridge in 1955, first as an assistant in research, then as a Reader and finally to a chair created for him in 1964. He was a founding fellow of Churchill College, Cambridge.

Bullard became one of the most important geophysicists of his day. He also did studies of the ocean floor, even though he suffered from seasickness and could rarely take scientific trips on the ocean. He was important to dynamo theory, hence his most important work concerned the source of the Earth's magnetic field. He was often frustrated by efforts to increase geophysical interest at the University of Cambridge. In his career he won the Hughes Medal, the Vetlesen Prize and the Gold Medal of the Royal Astronomical Society. He was elected to the American Academy of Arts and Sciences in 1954. In 1965, he was awarded the Alexander Agassiz Medal from the National Academy of Sciences, of which he was a member, for his significant investigations of the earth from its surface to its core. He was elected to the American Philosophical Society in 1969.

Then during the early 1960s Bullard and his associates used a computer to try to fit all of the continents together. Instead of using the shorelines, as other geophysicists had done, he used a depth of 914 meters (3000 ft) below sea level. This depth corresponds to about halfway between the shoreline and the ocean basins and represents the true edge of the continents. By doing this he discovered a near perfect fit among the continents put together. With this discovery he helped further the idea of a supercontinent that an earlier geophysicist, Alfred Wegener, had suggested calling Pangaea. It turned out a posteriori that a very similar result had been published thirty years earlier by the French geologist Boris Choubert, but this work published in French in a francophone journal of low international influence had remained virtually unknown.

After retiring from Cambridge in 1974 he settled to a position at the University of California, San Diego.  Bullard died in La Jolla, California, in 1980. His papers are held by the Churchill Archives Centre.

See also 
List of geophysicists

References

Further reading

External links

Bullard photo
Cambridge article

1907 births
1980 deaths
Geologists from Norwich
People educated at Norwich School
Alumni of Clare College, Cambridge
Academic staff of the University of Toronto
Fellows of Churchill College, Cambridge
British geophysicists
Fellows of the Royal Society
Foreign associates of the National Academy of Sciences
Knights Bachelor
Wollaston Medal winners
Royal Medal winners
Recipients of the Gold Medal of the Royal Astronomical Society
Scientists of the National Physical Laboratory (United Kingdom)
Tectonicists
Marine geophysicists
British expatriates in Canada
British expatriates in the United States
Members of the American Philosophical Society